Rajapaksha Gedara Gunathilaka Rajapaksha (born 8 November 1957) is a Sri Lankan politician, former provincial councillor and Member of Parliament.

Rajapaksha was born on 8 November 1957. He was a member of Poojapitiya Divisional Council and the Central Provincial Council. He contested the 2020 parliamentary election as a Sri Lanka People's Freedom Alliance electoral alliance candidate in Kandy District and was elected to the Parliament of Sri Lanka.

References

1957 births
Living people
Local authority councillors of Sri Lanka
Members of the 16th Parliament of Sri Lanka
Members of the Central Provincial Council
Sinhalese politicians
Sri Lankan Buddhists
Sri Lanka People's Freedom Alliance politicians
Sri Lanka Podujana Peramuna politicians
United People's Freedom Alliance politicians